The State Bank of Edinburg on Main Ave. in Edinburg, North Dakota was built in 1900.  It has also been known as Citizens State Bank.  It was listed on the National Register of Historic Places (NRHP) in 2001.  According to the building's NRHP nomination form, it is the last remaining banking house from the early 1900s and an example of the banks that played an important role in the area's small towns.

References

Romanesque Revival architecture in North Dakota
Commercial buildings completed in 1900
Bank buildings on the National Register of Historic Places in North Dakota
National Register of Historic Places in Walsh County, North Dakota
1900 establishments in North Dakota